Victor Niederhoffer (born December 10, 1943) is an American hedge fund manager, champion squash player, bestselling author and statistician.

Life and career
Niederhoffer was born in Brooklyn to a Jewish family.

His paternal grandfather Martin (Martie), an accountant and court interpreter, married Birdie (née Kuminsky) in 1916. His maternal grandparents were Sam and Gertrude Eisenberg. 
His father, Dr. Arthur "Artie" Niederhoffer (1917–1981), graduated from Brooklyn College in 1937, and then from Brooklyn Law School, and finally with a Ph.D. from New York University (1963). He served in the New York City Police Department for 21 years (retiring as a lieutenant), and then taught as a professor of sociology at John Jay College of Criminal Justice for 14 years.  Also he taught at Hofstra University, Brooklyn College, New York University, Queens College, and the New York City Police Academy, authored several books on the police and criminology including Behind the Shield, The Ambivalent Force, The Gang, and The Police Family: From Station House to Ranch House (co-authored with his wife), and was awarded the President's Medal of John Jay College for his achievements in criminal justice.  His mother, Elaine (née Eisenberg) Niederhoffer (1925–2006), was an English teacher, author, and editor who had descended from a long line of rabbis. His brother Roy Niederhoffer, who is himself a hedge fund manager, worked for Victor and his hedge fund from 1987 to 1992, trading fixed-income securities.

Niederhoffer studied statistics and economics at Harvard University (B.A. 1964) and the University of Chicago (Ph.D. 1969).  He was a finance professor at the University of California, Berkeley (1967–1972). In 1965, while still at college, he co-founded with Frank Cross a company called Niederhoffer, Cross and Zeckhauser, Inc., an investment bank which sold privately held firms to public companies.  This firm is now called Niederhoffer Henkel, and was run by Lee Henkel (who died May 30, 2008), the former general counsel to the IRS.  Niederhoffer pioneered a mass marketing approach in investment banking and did a large volume of small deals at this firm.  He also bought many privately held firms with Dan Grossman, his partner during this period.

As a college professor in the 1960s and 1970s, Niederhoffer wrote academic articles about market inefficiencies, which led to the founding in 1980 of a trading firm, NCZ Commodities, Inc. (aka Niederhoffer Investments, Inc.).  The success of this firm attracted the attention of George Soros.  Niederhoffer became a partner of Soros and managed all of the fixed income and foreign exchange from 1982 to 1990.  Soros  said in The Alchemy of Finance that Niederhoffer was the only one of his managers who retired voluntarily from trading for him while still ahead. Soros held Niederhoffer in such high esteem that he sent his son to work for him to learn how to trade.

Academia
As an academic at Berkeley in the 1960s, Niederhoffer wrote a number of papers on anomalies in stock market behavior.  His paper Market Making and Reversal on the Stock Exchange (1966) made Niederhoffer the father of statistical arbitrage and of market microstructure studies.  He used innovative methods to search for opportunities in stock markets, such as his paper The Analysis of World Events and Stock Prices (1971), which used the font size of news print to determine the relative importance of news events and measure how they affected the stock market.  He left academia in 1972 to concentrate fully on his  business activities.

Returns
Niederhoffer Investments returned 35% a year from inception through 1996, when MAR ranked it the No. 1 hedge fund manager in the world. In 1997, Niederhoffer published a New York Times bestselling book, The Education of a Speculator.

1997 losses
In 1997, Niederhoffer Investments was not finding many opportunities for investments and, having returned much of its funds to customers such as George Soros, began investing the remaining 100 million dollars in areas where Niederhoffer later admitted that he did not have much expertise.  Niederhoffer decided to sell put options on Thai bank stocks to collect premium (being effectively long these stocks), which had fallen heavily in the Asian financial crisis, his bet being that the Thai government would not allow these companies to go out of business.  On October 27, 1997, losses resulting from this investment, combined with a 554-point (7.2%) single-day decline in the Dow Jones Industrial Average (the eighth largest point decline to date in index history), forced Niederhoffer Investments to close its doors. In a lawsuit that Niederhoffer later filed in the U.S. District Court for the Northern District of Illinois against the Chicago Mercantile Exchange, where he traded options, he alleged that floor traders colluded to drive the market down that day to force him out of his positions. Traders at the time said Refco may have been responsible for as much as $35 million of Niederhoffer's losses.

New fund
Since closing down his fund in 1997, he began trading for his own account again in 1998, after mortgaging his house and selling his antique silver collection.  This original fund is called Wimbledon Fund, the name reflecting his love of tennis. He began managing money for offshore clients in February 2002, with the Matador Fund. Niederhoffer employs proprietary computer programs that purports to predict short-term moves using multivariate time series analysis.  In a five-year period beginning in 2001, Niederhoffer's fund returned 50% a year (compounded). His worst year in this period was 2004, returning 40%. In 2005, he returned 56.2% (as reported in  News). On April 6, 2006, the industry group MarHedge awarded  Matador Fund Ltd. and Manchester Trading, two funds managed by Niederhoffer, the prize for best performance by a commodity trading advisor (CTA) in the two years 2004 and 2005.

However, Niederhoffer's funds were caught up in the 2007 subprime mortgage financial crisis, and the Matador Fund was closed in September 2007 after a decline in value of more than seventy-five percent.

From 2000 to 2003, Niederhoffer co-wrote with financial writer Laurel Kenner a weekly column on the markets  for CNBC MoneyCentral. He and Kenner co-wrote Practical Speculation (John Wiley & Sons, February 2003), c.e. Niederhoffer's life story, and the lessons he learned, were told in the 1997  book The Education of a Speculator.

Squash 
Niederhoffer was a winning hardball squash player and is a member of the squash hall of fame. Niederhoffer had never played squash when he entered Harvard University in 1960, but he had played other racquet sports.  One year later, he won the national junior title, and, by the time he graduated, he was the National Intercollegiate squash champion. He won the U.S. Nationals five times (a record exceeded only by Stanley Pearson, who won his sixth in 1923). He also won three national doubles titles. In 1975, he defeated one of the greatest players in the history of the game, Sharif Khan, in the final of the North American Open (the only time that Khan failed to win the title in the 13-year period between 1969 and 1981).

Other activities
Niederhoffer is also the founder of the NYC Junto, a libertarian group that was hosted on the first Thursday of every month from 1985 to 2017.  He is an enthusiast of Ayn Rand, and named two of his daughters Galt and Rand.  The NYC Junto focused on libertarianism, Objectivism and investing and was inspired by the Junto hosted by Benjamin Franklin in Philadelphia from 1727 to 1757.  He has six daughters and one son.

Bibliography

References

Notes

External links
 Daily Speculations – Victor Niederhoffer and Laurel Kenner website
 Writings
 The Education of a Speculator Book Reviews
 Article mentioning lawsuit
 Inside a hedge-fund meltdown article
 Blowing Up A Malcolm Gladwell 2002 article about the investment strategy of Niederhoffer, and the opposite strategy used by Nassim Taleb.
 The Blow-Up Artist A John Cassidy 2007 profile of Niederhoffer featured in The New Yorker
 Wall Street Journal article on the NYC Junto

1943 births
Living people
American finance and investment writers
American financial analysts
American hedge fund managers
American libertarians
American money managers
American male squash players
American statisticians
Harvard University alumni
Jewish American sportspeople
Objectivists
Writers from Brooklyn
Stock and commodity market managers
University of Chicago alumni
Brooklyn Law School alumni
Mathematicians from New York (state)